The 1997 Mosport Festival was a professional sports car racing event held at Mosport International Raceway in Bowmanville, Ontario, Canada on August 29 to the 31st, 1997. It was the seventh round of the 1997 Professional SportsCar Racing Championship season.  The weekend featured a  separate 1 hour 45 minute, 52 lap Exxon Supreme GT Series race for GT cars on the Saturday and a 2-hour, 86 lap Exxon World SportsCar Championship race for World Sports Cars on the Sunday.  The split races were the only time since the 1995 revival of the Mosport IMSA round that the race has gone two instead of three hours.

The World Sports Car race was won by the Central Arkansas Racing team with drivers Ron Fellows and Rob Morgan driving a Ferrari 333 SP. The Sunday race attracted more than 30,000 spectators with an estimated total of 100,000 over the four-day festival.

The weekend included the eleventh race of the 1997 Trans-Am season won by Tommy Kendall in a Ford Mustang for his eleventh straight win of the season. The festival also included concerts at the track by Tom Cochrane and the Goo Goo Dolls.

Race results

Exxon World SportsCar Championship

 Time of race: 2 hours, 3.205 seconds
 Average speed: 170.092 km-per-hour
 Margin of victory: 0.89 seconds
 Fastest race lap: Andrea Montermini, 1:12.527 (196.430 km/h), lap 61

Exxon Supreme GT Series

 Time of race: 1 hour, 46 minutes 1.543 seconds
 Average speed: 116.452 km-per-hour
 Margin of victory: 15.256 seconds
 Fastest race lap: #66  Panoz GTR-1 Ford, 1:18.634   (181.1638 km/h), lap  23

Trans-Am Series

 Time of race: 1 hour, 5 minutes, 46 seconds
 Average speed: 89.735 miles-per-hour
 Margin of victory: 1.3730 seconds
 Fastest race lap: Tommy Kendall, 1:22.117 (107.802 mph), lap 30

References

Grand Prix of Mosport
Mosport
1997 in Ontario